Dehalogenimonas formicexedens  is a Gram-negative, strictly anaerobic and non-spore-forming bacterium from the genus of Dehalogenimonas which has been isolated from contaminated groundwater in Louisiana in the United States.

References

External links
Type strain of Dehalogenimonas formicexedens at BacDive -  the Bacterial Diversity Metadatabase

 

Bacteria described in 2017
Dehalococcoidetes